Edgar Allan Forbes was an international reporter from the U.S. in the early 20th century. He traveled widely. He lauded American missionary physicians in an editorial. He wrote for The World's Work and traveled to Africa to write and take photographs for newspaper dispatches. While there he also wrote a book titled White Man's Africa. He also reported for the AP in Liberia. 

In 1913 he was managing editor for Frank Leslie's Illustrated Weekly (Frank Leslie's Illustrated Newspaper). His photographic work included an image of funeral pyres on the Ganges River in India and of the remote mountain town of Adjuntas, Puerto Rico.

In 1910 he was scheduled to give a talk on Black Man's Africa to the Booksellers Guild.

References

American newspaper journalists
20th-century American non-fiction writers